Thomas Joseph LaGarde (born February 10, 1955) is an American former professional basketball player. He played in the National Basketball Association (NBA) from 1977 to 1985. LaGarde earned a gold medal as a member of Team USA in the 1976 Olympics, and an NBA Championship in 1979 with the Seattle SuperSonics.

Basketball career
After playing collegiately at the University of North Carolina, LaGarde was selected 9th overall in the first round of the 1977 NBA draft by the Denver Nuggets.

At 6'10" and 220 lb, LaGarde played forward and center in the NBA.  After spending his rookie season with the Nuggets, LaGarde spent the following two seasons with the Seattle SuperSonics, winning an NBA Championship with the Sonics in 1979.

In 1980, he was selected by the expansion Dallas Mavericks that offseason in the 1980 expansion draft. LaGarde was the only team member who played all 82 games for the Mavericks in their inaugural 1980-81 season, finishing second on the team in points to Jim Spanarkel and leading the team in rebounds and block shots.

LaGarde saw his playing time diminish the following season, averaging just 19 minutes per game in 47 games for the Mavericks.  He played the two following seasons overseas.

LaGarde returned to the NBA in 1984, playing for the New Jersey Nets. But he appeared in only one game with them before suffering a season-ending calf injury.

Personal life
In 2008, he created a video parody of McCain-Palin called the Original Mavericks for Truth

Tom and his wife, Heather, live in Saxapahaw, North Carolina, with their two children. Together, they redeveloped an old mill, which is now a 700-person music venue, called the Haw River Ballroom.

Notes

External links
Career statistics
Haw River Ballroom

1955 births
Living people
American expatriate basketball people in Italy
American men's basketball players
Basketball players at the 1975 Pan American Games
Basketball players at the 1976 Summer Olympics
Basketball players from Detroit
Centers (basketball)
Dallas Mavericks expansion draft picks
Dallas Mavericks players
Denver Nuggets draft picks
Denver Nuggets players
Detroit Catholic Central High School alumni
Medalists at the 1975 Pan American Games
Medalists at the 1976 Summer Olympics
New Jersey Nets players
North Carolina Tar Heels men's basketball players
Nuova Pallacanestro Gorizia players
Olympic gold medalists for the United States in basketball
Pan American Games gold medalists for the United States
Pan American Games medalists in basketball
Parade High School All-Americans (boys' basketball)
People from Alamance County, North Carolina
Power forwards (basketball)
Seattle SuperSonics players
United States men's national basketball team players